Rurouni Kenshin: Trust & Betrayal, known in Japan as , is an original video animation (OVA) series, based on the Rurouni Kenshin manga series written and illustrated by Nobuhiro Watsuki, and it is a prequel to the anime television series adaptation of the same name. Trust & Betrayal chronicles the story of Himura Kenshin as the Hitokiri Battōsai during the final years of the Bakumatsu era while also revealing the origins of his cross-shaped scar and exploring his relationship with a woman named Yukishiro Tomoe.

The OVA series was first licensed by ADV Films for VHS and DVD releases in North America and the United Kingdom, and by Madman Entertainment for releases in Australasia, under the title Samurai X: Trust & Betrayal. Trust & Betrayal was later collected into a two-hour feature-length motion picture with new animated sequences and released theatrically in Japan. In 2003, this movie edition was eventually released in North America on DVD as a director's cut edition by ADV Films. After ADV Films' closure in 2009, Aniplex of America licensed the OVA series for a Blu-ray release in North America under its original title: Rurouni Kenshin: Trust & Betrayal. The OVA was praised for its story, animation, art, music and Japanese voice acting.

Plot
While a raid of bandits slay a group of travelers, a young boy named Shinta is saved from death by a passing swordsman. The swordsman, known as Hiko Seijūrō, is a master of the Hiten Mitsurugi, the strongest of all sword forms. After seeing the boy bury the bodies of not only the travelers but also the bandits, Hiko is impressed and takes Shinta as an apprentice, renaming him "Kenshin", a name which he felt was more appropriate for a swordsman.

After years of training, Kenshin leaves his master following a vehement argument, convinced that the only way to uphold the Hiten Mitsurugi's pledge to help the weak and innocent is to join the revolution poised to upend the Tokugawa shogunate. He joins the Choshu clan's Kiheitai under Takasugi Shinsaku, and soon works for their leader, Katsura Kogorō, as an assassin alongside I'izuka, the examiner of executions. Kenshin soon becomes a hardened killer, feared far and wide as the Hitokiri Battōsai. During a successful assassination, he kills a bodyguard named Kiyosato Akira. The encounter with Kiyosato leaves Kenshin with the first half of his cross-shaped scar. After killing a skilled assassin apparently sent to kill him, Kenshin meets a woman named Yukishiro Tomoe, unaware of the fact that she is the fiancée of Kiyosato. Kenshin, confused on whether to kill her or not after she witnesses him kill, decides to takes her to the inn where he and the men of the Choshu clan are residing. Katsura suspects a spy among the Choshu after Kenshin informs him of the assassin he killed since only a few select members of the clan know of Kenshin's existence.

After the Ikedaya affair, Katsura arranges for Kenshin and Tomoe to hide in the village of Otsu as husband and wife, so the two would not be suspected. For the next few months Kenshin and Tomoe become closer and warmer towards each other as the two live together.  During this time, it is then revealed that I'izuka is the real spy as he meets up with the Shogunate task force, who were assigned to track down and kill Kenshin, to report on Kenshin's current state.  They then send Tomoe's brother Enishi to visit Tomoe, who then secretly reveals to his sister that the shogunate agents are close by, and that her revenge will be complete. Tomoe sends Enishi off, feeling ill at ease.  At this point, it is revealed that Tomoe originally conspired with the Shogunate task to kill Kenshin, however she begins to have a change of heart.  It is here that Tomoe realizes that she has fallen in love with Kenshin, and Kenshin also falling in love with Tomoe. The two embrace for the night; the next morning, Tomoe leaves the house and tries to deceive the shogunate men into giving up their pursuit of Kenshin and unsuccessfully attempts to kill their leader.

After Tomoe's disappearance, Kenshin is visited by I'izuka who tells him that the spy is Tomoe and that she is meeting at that moment with her co-conspirators, so he must go there and kill her. He also reveals to Kenshin that she is the fiancée of Kiyosato, the man he killed, which leaves Kenshin in an extremely distraught state. Kenshin, however, at this point is still unaware that I'izuka is also a spy for the Shogunate. While heading to Tomoe's location, a heavily shocked Kenshin faces and kills three of the four shogunate agents set up to kill him along the path, but becomes badly injured due to his traumatized state. While Kenshin is fighting with the leader, Tomoe steps in between the two to protect Kenshin from the killing blow. This allows Kenshin to kill his opponent but, in doing so, he unintentionally impales Tomoe also. Before her death, she gives him the second part of his cross-shaped wound.

Kenshin, blaming himself for Tomoe's death, swears to fight to bring about the age desired by Katsura, but after that to continue fighting to protect the innocent without killing again. Katsura informs Kenshin that he had a new assassin deal with I'izuka and handle the assassinations from then on. As the Tokugawa shogunate is nearing its end, Kenshin has his first encounter with the Shinsengumi captains Okita Sōji and his future rival, Saitō Hajime. It is then revealed that once the Bakumatsu revolution had ended, the Hitokiri Battōsai had disappeared without a trace. Then Kenshin returns to the graves of the travelers he buried when he was a child and places Tomoe's scarf on them. Sometime afterwards, Hiko Seijūrō passes by the site and notices the scarf, realizing Kenshin had finally learned his lesson.

Cast

Production
Daryl Surat of Otaku USA stated that this series uses a more "realistic" art style than the television series uses, and that the series has "graphic, bloody violence galore" beginning in the opening sequence.

One of the major themes of Trust is understanding the repercussions and after-effects murder can have, something that Kenshin has yet to comprehend though others have tried to point it out to him.

Release

The four episodes of Rurouni Kenshin: Trust & Betrayal were first released in four VHS sets by SPE Visual Works from February 20 to September 22, 1999. A "Director's Cut" volume, which included the four episodes, was later released on VHS on November 20, 1999, and on DVD on December 18 of the same year. It was later released in four DVD sets on March 23, 2001. Aniplex launched a Blu-ray set on August 24, 2011.

In North America, the OVA was licensed by A.D. Vision and released under the title Samurai X: Trust & Betrayal. They first released the series in two VHS sets; Trust on August 22, 2000, and Betrayal on November 14 of the same year. It also released on two DVDs on October 10 and November 7, 2000. The "Director's Cut" DVD volume was released on May 20, 2003. Aniplex of America released the OVA on a Blu-ray set, under the title Rurouni Kenshin: Trust & Betrayal, on August 23, 2011.

In Australia and New Zealand, the OVA was released by Madman Entertainment on two DVD sets on December 4, 2000, and March 20, 2001. In the United Kingdom, two DVDs were released by A.D. Vision on January 27 and March 17, 2003.

Reception
Trust & Betrayal'''s story, animation, art, music and Japanese voice acting have all been heavily praised by various critics and, consequently, the series itself has been widely acknowledged as a masterpiece and one of anime's crowning achievements.

THEM Anime Reviews gave the entire OVA series a perfect score of 5 out of 5 stars, with reviewer Tim Jones stating, "powerful, evocative, saddening, and heavily charged, Rurouni Kenshin: Trust & Betrayal is a series that goes far beyond its comic-book origins, testing the limits of not only its franchise, but the medium of original video animation as a storytelling device. Furthermore, while it surpasses the original television series in many ways, it remains complementary and insightful to why Kenshin becomes the way he is. After all, nothing builds character quite so well as a stirring tragedy. It doesn't get much more tragic or stirring than this." He summarised the series as "dramatic, tragic, beautiful" and "a sterling example of Japanese animation at its finest".Trust & Betrayal has received significant praise from Anime News Network reviewers. Mike Crandol noted it as one of the greatest OVA series of all time, celebrating the new characters designs as well as the fights scenes which were also noted to be "terribly bloody" and beautiful at the same time. In his review, Carl Kimlinger described the series as "stirring, devastating, smart, redemptive and pure perfection" and gave the series an 'A+' rating for the subbed version and an 'A' rating for the dub. Bamboo Dong claimed that watching this series would benefit the viewer with a "stunning overall experience" before finishing off that "Rurouni Kenshin: Tsuioku Hen is a masterpiece, with dramatic visuals and beautiful animation".Animerica reviewer Rio Yañez praised Trusts "introspective take on violence" as well as its being "chock-full of insane samurai sword fights and free-flying appendages" while avoiding stereotypical freeze frame animation. While considering the violence "over the top", he felt it was well handled, avoiding being excessive or gratuitous, and that the action scenes were "well balanced by the lavish background paintings and designs". He did criticize ADV Film's English dub as "kung fu style dubbing", noting that the voice actors frequently mispronounced the Japanese names and left the voice track mildly confusing despite the English script's serious take of the material.

DVD Talk reviewer Don Houston found the OVA's story and music solid. The director's cut version received positive comments by how the four OVAs were arranged with Houston commenting it "seems more like a movie that stands alone, rather than just the precursor to a long lasting series."

Daryl Surat of Otaku USA said that, despite what Dave Riley said, viewers should watch the television series before watching Trust & Betrayal. Surat explained that the OVA has "great moments" that a viewer unfamiliar with the television series would not "bat an eye toward."

See also

 Rurouni Kenshin: The Beginning (2021), a live-action film adaptation of the same storyline
 To Kill with Intrigue'' (1977), a Jackie Chan film involving similar plot elements

References

External links
 Official Aniplex of America website

1999 anime OVAs
ADV Films
Adventure anime and manga
Aniplex
Drama anime and manga
Films set in 1864
Films set in Kyoto
Martial arts anime and manga
OVAs based on manga
Anime and manga about revenge
Romance anime and manga
Rurouni Kenshin
Samurai in anime and manga
Studio Deen
Uxoricide in fiction